The following lists events that happened during 1945 in Chile.

Incumbents
President of Chile: Juan Antonio Ríos

Events

January
14 January - The 1945 South American Championship begins, with headquarters in the Estadio Nacional de Chile of Santiago.

February
28 February - The 1945 South American Championship current Copa América, ends; Argentina is crowned champion, second place goes to Brazil, followed by Chile in third place, and Uruguay in fourth place.

March
4 March – Chilean parliamentary election, 1945

April
20 April - The 3rd edition of the Championship of Champions begins.

May
14 May - The President of the Republic, Juan Antonio Rios, forms a new cabinet made up of the Radical, Democratic, Authentic Socialist and National Falange parties.
15 May - The senators and deputies elected in the election of March 4 take office for the period May 15, 1945 - May 15, 1949.
20 May - The 3rd edition of the Championship of Champions ends, Colo-Colo is crowned champion of the championship.

June
19 June – 1945 El Teniente mining accident;355 workers die from carbon monoxide emissions. It is considered the largest accident in a metallurgical mine in the world.
26 June - Chile is one of the 51 founding states of the United Nations Organization when signing the Charter of the United Nations in San Francisco, United States.

October
12 October - The Independencia Stadium is inaugurated in the commune of Independencia, Santiago and belonging to the Club Deportivo Universidad Catolica.

December
10 December - Professor Gabriela Mistral receives the Nobel Prize for Literature awarded by the Swedish Academy.

Births 
18 January – Isabel Allende (politician)
26 February – Pedro Carcuro
18 April – Guillermo Páez
3 September – Leonardo Véliz
15 October – Florcita Motuda

Deaths
26 June – Javier Ángel Figueroa (b. 1862)
19 July – Luis Claro Solar (b. 1857)

References 

 
Years of the 20th century in Chile
Chile